De'Vante Harris (born June 30, 1994) is a former American football cornerback. He played college football at Texas A&M. Harris was signed by the New Orleans Saints as an undrafted free agent in 2016.

College career
Harris attended and played college football for Texas A&M from 2012-2015.

Professional career

New Orleans Saints
After going undrafted in the 2016 NFL Draft, Harris signed with the New Orleans Saints on May 2, 2016.

On December 2, 2017, Harris was waived by the Saints and re-signed to the practice squad. He signed a reserve/future contract with the Saints on January 16, 2018. He was waived by the Saints on August 11, 2018.

Tampa Bay Buccaneers
On August 12, Harris was claimed off waivers by the Tampa Bay Buccaneers. He was placed on injured reserve on September 8, 2018 with a hamstring injury. On September 11, Harris was waived by the Buccaneers with an injury settlement. On October 23, 2018, Harris was re-signed by the Buccaneers.

On March 15, 2019, Harris was re-signed by the Buccaneers. He was waived during final roster cuts on August 30, 2019.

References

External links
 New Orleans Saints profile
 Texas A&M Aggies bio
 

1994 births
Living people
American football cornerbacks
New Orleans Saints players
People from Mesquite, Texas
Players of American football from Texas
Sportspeople from the Dallas–Fort Worth metroplex
Tampa Bay Buccaneers players
Texas A&M Aggies football players